Wojciech Tyc (born July 15, 1955 in Milówka) is a former Polish football player. He played once for Poland.

References

Sources

 

1950 births
Living people
Polish footballers
Poland international footballers
Odra Opole players
Valenciennes FC players
Amiens SC players
Expatriate footballers in France
Ligue 1 players
Polish expatriate footballers
People from Żywiec County
Polish football managers
Odra Opole managers
Sportspeople from Silesian Voivodeship
Association football forwards